Gražina Degutytė-Švažienė  (born 7 June 1938 in Tauragė) is a Lithuanian ceramic artist.

Biography
Gražina Degutytė-Švažienė graduated from the Lithuanian Institute of Fine Arts. Since 1962, she has worked and taught at the Lithuanian Institute of Art (since 1990 at the Vilnius Academy of Fine Arts).
She has curated exhibits.

Awards
 1982 Lithuanian Art Fund Prize, Lithuanian Ministry of Culture

Works
 pano "Kalnai", 1972 m., Dombajus, Karačiajų Čerkesija
 pano "Uždanga" ir plokštės "Atspindžiai" 1980 m., Ponizovka, Krymas
 plokštės "Pajūrio architektūra" ir šviestuvai "Burės", "Slibinas" 1992 m., poilsio namai "Auksinės kopos", Nida
 plokštės "Augalai" 1996 m., Lietuvos telekomas, Vilnius

See also
 List of Lithuanian painters

References

External links
 "Gražina Degutytė-Švažienė", Lithuanian Wikipedia

1938 births
Living people
20th-century Lithuanian women artists
21st-century Lithuanian women artists
People from Tauragė
Lithuanian painters
Vilnius Academy of Arts alumni
Academic staff of the Vilnius Academy of Arts